American Swing is an American 2008 documentary about the 1970s phenomenon of swinging at Plato's Retreat in New York City directed by Matthew Kaufman.

See also
The Lifestyle
Swingtown
Plato's Retreat
Open marriage

References

External links

American documentary films
2008 films
2008 documentary films
 
Documentary films about New York City
2000s English-language films
2000s American films